Federal Route 277, or Persiaran Perdana, is a federal road in Kedah, Malaysia. The Kilometre Zero is located at Sintok.

Features
At most sections, the Federal Route 277 was built under the JKR R5 road standard, allowing maximum speed limit of up to 90 km/h.

List of junctions

References

277